60S ribosomal protein L13 is a protein that in humans is encoded by the RPL13 gene.

Function 

Ribosomes, the organelles that catalyze protein synthesis, consist of a small 40S subunit and a large 60S subunit. Together these subunits are composed of 4 RNA species and approximately 80 structurally distinct proteins. This gene encodes a ribosomal protein that is a component of the 60S subunit. The protein belongs to the L13E family of ribosomal proteins. It is located in the cytoplasm. This gene is expressed at significantly higher levels in benign breast lesions than in breast carcinomas. Transcript variants derived from alternative splicing and/or alternative polyadenylation exist; these variants encode the same protein. As is typical for genes encoding ribosomal proteins, there are multiple processed pseudogenes of this gene dispersed through the genome.

Interactions 

RPL13 has been shown to interact with CDC5L.

Bbc1
Bbc1 (Mti1p) is a protein expressed in yeasts that is thought to associate with actin networks. Bbc1 is short for Bni1 synthetic lethal and Bee1 (las17) complex member. The alternate name, Mti1p, is short for Myosin tail region-interacting protein. Bbc1 is involved in cytoskeletal regulation during endocytosis. Budding yeast Bbc1 inhibits the activator of the Arp2/3 complex Las17 (WASp homolog). The protein also interacts with the tail of Myosin 1 proteins. 

In fission yeast, Bbc1 is considered a WIP family cytoskeletal protein. Bbc1 localizes to actin cortical patches, cell division sites, the cell tip, and the cytosol. Cells with bbc1 gene deletion are viable. Bbc1 is affinity captured by the Nebulin-family actin filament anchoring protein Cyk3 and the SMARCAD1 family ATP-dependent DNA helicase Fft3. Bbc1 competes with WIP homolog Vrp1 to bind the Myosin 1 tail to regulate actin assembly at endocytic sites.

References

Further reading

External links 
 PDBe-KB provides an overview of all the structure information available in the PDB for Human 60S ribosomal protein L13

Ribosomal proteins